The 2008 United States presidential election in Mississippi took place on November 4, 2008, and was part of the 2008 United States presidential election. Voters chose 6 representatives, or electors to the Electoral College, who voted for president and vice president.

Mississippi was won by Republican nominee John McCain with a 13.2% margin of victory. Prior to the election, all 17 news organizations considered this a state McCain would win, or otherwise a red state. Although the state has the largest African American percentage in the country, Mississippi remains a safe red state at the presidential level, having voted Republican every election year since 1980. While there was comparably high African American turnout compared to previous elections in Mississippi and Obama performed significantly better than Kerry in 2004, it was not enough to overcome the state's strong Republican leanings.

As of 2020, this is the last time Mississippi has voted to the right of West Virginia, North Dakota, South Dakota, or Montana.

Primaries 
Mississippi Democratic primary, 2008
Mississippi Republican primary, 2008

Campaign

Predictions
There were 16 news organizations who made state-by-state predictions of the election. Here are their last predictions before election day:

Polling

McCain won every single pre-election poll, each with at least 50% of the vote with the exception of the one of them. The final 3 polls average gave the Republican a lead of 51% to 39%.

Fundraising
John McCain raised a total of $1,386,749 in the state. Barack Obama raised $768,981.

Advertising and visits
Obama spent $238,401. McCain and his interest groups spent $139,999. The McCain ticket visited three times. Obama's ticket visited the state once.

Analysis 
Mississippi is one of the most racially polarized states in presidential elections. African Americans uniformly vote Democratic while Whites vote Republican nearly as uniformly. In 2004, 14% of Caucasians voted for John Kerry and 10% of African Americans voted for Bush, according to exit polling.

White Democrats began splitting their tickets in national elections as early as the 1940s when the national party became more friendly to the Civil Rights Movement, culminating when Barry Goldwater carried the state with a staggering 87 percent of the vote in 1964.  The Republican trend accelerated in the late 1970s with the rise of the religious right, which appealed to its status as a Bible Belt state.  The last Democratic presidential nominee to win Mississippi was Jimmy Carter in 1976, even then, he only won it by 1.9 points. Due to its status as a safe red state, little campaigning took place in Mississippi by either of the two major party candidates.  Indeed, the state was last seriously contested in 1980.

In 2008, Barack Obama was able to improve on Kerry's performance by six percent, mainly due to the higher African American turnout. Obama's main support was in the western delta counties next to the Mississippi River. In contrast, McCain's margins came from the regions bordering the Gulf Coast, the northeast Appalachian area and the Jackson and Memphis suburbs. Voting became even more polarized: nine in ten Whites voted Republican, and nearly all African-Americans voted Democratic in Mississippi, according to exit polls. As expected, McCain carried the Magnolia State by a comfortable 13.18-point margin over Obama. McCain's margin of victory, however, was less than that of George W. Bush's 19.69-point margin of victory over John Kerry in 2004.

Mississippi was also the only state to list the official candidates of the Reform Party on their ballot.

At the same time, incumbent Republican U.S. Senator Thad Cochran was reelected with 61.44% of the vote over Democrat Erik Fleming who received 38.56%. Appointed U.S. Senator Roger Wicker stood for election as well in 2008 against former Democratic Governor Ronnie Musgrove. The race was expected to be much closer, but the Republicans ran ads accusing Musgrove of supporting gay rights, not a popular position in this strongly socially conservative state. Wicker defeated Musgrove by almost 10 points, 54.96%-45.04%.

Results

By county

Counties that flipped from Democratic to Republican 
 Benton (largest municipality: Ashland)

Counties that flipped from Republican to Democratic 
 Chickasaw (largest municipality: Okolona)
 Copiah (largest municipality: Hazlehurst)
 Oktibbeha (largest municipality: Starkville)
 Panola (largest municipality: Sardis)
 Pike (largest municipality: Magnolia)
 Yazoo (largest municipality: Yazoo City)

By congressional district
John McCain carried three of the state’s four congressional districts, including two districts held by Democrats.

Electors 

Technically the voters of Mississippi cast their ballots for electors: representatives to the Electoral College. Mississippi is allocated 6 electors because it has 4 congressional districts and 2 senators. All candidates who appear on the ballot or qualify to receive write-in votes must submit a list of 6 electors, who pledge to vote for their candidate and his or her running mate. Whoever wins the majority of votes in the state is awarded all 6 electoral votes. Their chosen electors then vote for president and vice president. Although electors are pledged to their candidate and running mate, they are not obligated to vote for them. An elector who votes for someone other than his or her candidate is known as a faithless elector.

The electors of each state and the District of Columbia met on December 15, 2008, to cast their votes for president and vice president. The Electoral College itself never meets as one body. Instead the electors from each state and the District of Columbia met in their respective capitols.

The following were the members of the Electoral College from the state. All 6 were pledged to John McCain and Sarah Palin:
Jim Barksdale
Barry Bridgforth
Fred Carl
Bobby Chain
Charles Doty
Victor Mavar

References 

Mississippi
2008 Mississippi elections
2008